Palm Island is a small private island near Aruba, Kingdom of the Netherlands, serving as a tourist attraction.

The island is a 5-minute ferry ride from the mainland. The island includes a small beach and a water park.

Tourist attractions
The beach area extends a short distance into the ocean. It is forbidden to go far out from the beach, to protect both people and life in the sea.

Blue Parrotfish Water Park has water-slides and a little pool. The island has an "all-you-can-eat" buffet beverage, and giftshops.

Snorkeling is one of the main activities on the island, as many of Aruba's many species of fish exist here, including the blue parrotfish.

The water park has an extraordinary attraction. Visitors, equipped with an underwater SeaTREK helmet diving system, can visit the tropical fish world of the coral island on foot and also take underwater shots of a downed and submerged Cessna 414 aircraft. Non-swimmers and people without a diving experience also can use the Sea Trek helmet system.

References

External links 
 Palm Island on Aruba Official Tourism Portal

Islands of Aruba
Tourist attractions in Aruba
Private islands of the Caribbean